Flyer (also known as Alaska Eagle 1981-2013) is a  one-off aluminium ocean racing ketch designed by Sparkman & Stephens and built by Jachtwerf W. Huisman. She won the 1977–78 Whitbread Round the World Race skippered by Conny van Rietschoten.

1977–78 Flyer crew

 Conny van Rietschoten – Skipper
 Gerard (Gerry) Dijkstra – Navigator/Watchleader
 Aedgard Koekebakker – Watchleader
 John Anderson
 Bruce Ashwood
 Bert Dykema – Doctor
 Adrian Ford – Sailmaker
 Billy Johnson
 Marcel Laurin – Cook
 Chris Moselen
 Ari Steinberg
 Rod White
 Hugh Wilson – Shipwright

References

Volvo Ocean Race yachts
Sailing yachts of the Netherlands
Sailing yachts of the United States
Sailboat type designs by Rod Sparkman
Sailboat type designs by Olin Stephens
Sailboat type designs by Sparkman and Stephens
Sailing yachts built in the Netherlands
1970s sailing yachts